Marburg Süd railway station is a train station in the south of Marburg in Hesse on the Main-Weser Railway.

References 

Buildings and structures in Marburg
Railway stations in Hesse